The Danish Rugby League Championship is the contest for the domestic championship in rugby league.  As there are two clubs in Denmark, Copenhagen RLFC and Jutland RLFC, this competition is combined with the Danish State of Origin championship.

Prior to 2013, rugby league in Denmark had been entirely based around the Denmark national rugby league team.  The founding of two clubs Copenhagen RLFC and Jutland RLFC in 2013 enabled domestic games to be played, alongside the Pan Scandinavian League.  Although two games are played per year, an aggregate score is not kept, in order to ensure each game remains relevant.  The winner of the match becomes the domestic champions.  Copenhagen RLFC have won all three games thus far, meaning they are reigning champions.

See also

Denmark national rugby league team
Denmark Rugby League Federation
List of rugby league competitions

References

External links

Rugby league in Denmark
European rugby league competitions